David Isaac Murray (born 27 August 1983) is an entrepreneur, computer scientist, and product designer best known for his appearance as one of the main cast members on Start-Ups: Silicon Valley. Originally a product manager at Google from 2006–2008, he received the Google Founders Award and EMG Award for his work on Gmail. After Google, David held several senior positions at start up companies in Silicon Valley, California. He started his company, GoalSponsors, in 2012 and eventually sold it to Doctor.com in 2014. He served as Chief Technology Officer of Doctor.com until 2019. David is currently Cofounder and President of Confirm, an HR technology company focused on performance reviews and organizational network analysis.

Early life
Murray grew up in Albuquerque, New Mexico. He attended the Albuquerque Academy from grades 6-12. He attended Carnegie Mellon University as a triple major in Computer Science, Human-Computer Interaction, and Voice Performance, where he graduated in 2006, Phi Beta Kappa, as recipient of the CMU Alumni Award for Research Excellence in Computer Science.

Business history
Murray was Associate Product Manager for Gmail at Google from 2006–2008. He later served as Senior VP, Product Management at Inform Technologies in 2008, User Experience Lead at Cryptic Studios 2008–2010, and Director of Product for Raptr 2010-2012 before founding GoalSponsors which later became known as ReferBright, a marketing automation platform for healthcare practitioners, and was sold to Doctor.com in 2014. He served as Chief Technology Officer at Doctor.com (acquired by Press Ganey in 2020). Murray is currently Cofounder and President of Confirm, an HR technology company focused on performance reviews and organizational network analysis.

Television, film, and media
In 2012, Murray appeared as one of the main cast on Bravo's TV Show Start-Ups: Silicon Valley working on an accountability buddies mobile app called GoalSponsors. He has authored articles in publications including FastCompany and has been a contributing author to Forbes through his membership with the Forbes Technology Council. His writing focuses on the intersection of business, technology, and the human experience.

Awards
2013 Named "One to Watch" by BRINK Magazine
2008 Google Founders Award, EMG Award
2006 Carnegie Mellon SCS Alumni Award for Research Excellence in Computer Science
2006 Andrew Carnegie Society Scholar, Mortar Board Senior Honor Society
2005 Phi Beta Kappa
2001 Cum Laude National Honor Society

Board and Council Memberships
Member, Forbes Technology Council (2018–present)
Board member, Carnegie Mellon University Alumni Association Board (2017–present)
Board member, Carnegie Mellon University School of Computer Science Alumni Advisory Board (2005–present)
President, Rainbow Recreation (2015–present)
Board member, South Bay Volleyball Club (2013–present)

References

External links 
David I. Murray
Doctor.com Management
David Murray - Forbes Technology Council

1983 births
Living people
People from Albuquerque, New Mexico
Participants in American reality television series
Carnegie Mellon University alumni
Stanford University alumni
American chief technology officers